Highway 7B is the designation for seven former business routes of Highway 7 in the Canadian province of Ontario. All but one was the original route of Highway7 (or what became Highway7) through the town or city that it served, and was subsequently given the 7B designation when a newer bypass route was constructed to reduce traffic pressure on the urban street network.

The following entries are listed in geographic order, from west to east.

New Hamburg 

Highway 7B through New Hamburg and Baden was created in 1957 when Highway 7 and Highway 8 were realigned to a new bypass, with Highway 7B assuming the former alignment; the route ran concurrently with Highway 8B for its entire length. The province transferred the route to the Waterloo County in 1970 and is now known as Waterloo Regional Road 1.

Kitchener 

Highway 7B between Baden and Kitchener was created in 1973 when Highway 7 and Highway 8 were realigned to a new corridor. Highway 7B assuming the former alignment between Baden and Kitchener, running concurrently with Highway 8B for its entire length. It followed Gingerich Road, Snyder's Road, Highland Road, and Queen Street (present-day Waterloo Regional Road 6) before following Courtland Avenue (present-day Waterloo Regional Road 53) and rejoining Highway 7/8. With urban sections already under the jurisdiction of the City of Kitchener, the province transferred the route to the Regional Municipality of Waterloo in 1975.

Thornhill 

Highway 7B through Thornhill was created in 1963 when Highway 7 realigned to a new bypass that followed sections of Bathurst Street and Langstaff Road, with Highway 7B assuming the former alignment along Centre Street to Yonge Street, where it was cosigned with Highway 11 until it rejoined Highway 7. In the mid-1970s the Highway 11 concurrency was dropped, while the remaining portion was decommissioned in 1985 and transferred to the Town of Vaughan when a Highway 7 was realigned and a greater portion of Centre Street was bypassed.

Lindsay 

Highway 7B through Lindsay was created in 1963 when Highway 7 and Highway 35 were realigned to a new bypass. Highway 7B assumed the former alignment along Kent Street and Lindsay Street, and was cosigned with Highway 35B for almost its entire length with the exception of an  section that was cosigned with Highway 35. In 1997, Highway 7B/35B was decommissioned with portions becoming Victoria County Road 15; however, the Highway 7B/35 concurrency remained until  when the Highway 7B signage was removed.

Major intersections

Peterborough 

Highway 7B through Peterborough was created in 1960 when Highway 7 was realigned to a new route between Peterborough and Fowlers Corners, with Lindsay Road, Chemong Road, Reid Street, McDonnel Street, Sherbrooke Street, George Street and Water Street re-designated as Highway 7B, rejoining Highway 7 at the intersection of George Street and Lansdowne Street. When the Peterborough Bypass opened in 1961, Highway 7 was relocated to the new route and Highway 7B was extended to link with the east end of Peterborough Bypass. Highway 7B was shifted through various streets in central Peterborough over the years, but in the end bypassed downtown by following Parkhill Road and Monaghan Road (a route followed from 1964-70 and 1974-97). Highway 7B was decommissioned in 1997, with rural sections in Peterborough County becoming Peterborough County Road 1 (Lindsay Road section) and Peterborough County Road 18 (Chemong Road section). The signage within the City of Peterborough has been removed and the route assumed the names of their respective city streets.

Major intersections

Madoc 

Highway 7B through Madoc was created in 1967 when Highway 7 was realigned to a new bypass, with Highway 7B assuming the former alignment. The province transferred the route to the Township of Madoc in 1969 and is currently known as Hastings County Road 23.

Carleton Place 

Highway7B was a  bypass along the northern edge of Carleton Place that existed between 1961 and 1998. When it was decommissioned on January 1, 1998, and transferred to Lanark County, it followed Townline Road from Highway7 easterly to Highway 15 (now Lanark County Road 29). The route was originally assumed by the Department of Highways on August11, 1948.
Though it remained unnumbered for several years, it was numbered as Highway110 in 1953. At that time, Highway7 was part of Highway15.

Construction of the Carleton Place Bypass began in the spring of 1958, with the aim of rerouting Highway15 traffic out of the downtown area. Prior to its completion, Highway15 entered Carleton Place along High Street, turning south onto Bridge Street, and along Moore Street and Franktown Road to the junction with Highway 29.
The bypass was designated as part of Highway15 on November19, 1959.
It opened several weeks later in early December as an unpaved road. Paving of the bypass took place the following spring.
Soon after, Highway110 was renumbered as part of Highway15B, following Townline Road east, then Bridge Street, Murray Street and Franktown Road south to the junction of the bypass and Highway29.

On September8, 1961. Highway15 was rerouted between Smiths Falls and Carleton Place to travel concurrently along Highway29; Highway7 was extended along the former routing of Highway15, from Perth to Carleton Place, and signed concurrently with Highway15 eastward to Ottawa. As a result of these changes, Highway15B became Highway7B.

From 1961-1994, Highway 7B followed Town Line Road and then shared a concurrency with Highway 29 (later renumbered to Highway 15 in ) along Bridge Street, Moore Street, and Franktown Road. When Highway 15 was realigned to an eastern bypass in 1994, Highway 7B was re-routed to continue east on Town Line Road to Highway 15 at McNeely Avenue. In 1998, Highway 7B was decommissioned and the route is now known as Lanark County Road 7B.

Major intersections

References 

007B
007B
Former segments of the Trans-Canada Highway